Saleh Al-Dawod (24 September 1968, Dir'iya, Riyadh, Saudi Arabia) is a former football player. He was part of the squad for the Saudi Arabia national team in the 1994 FIFA World Cup in the United States.

References 

Living people
1968 births
1992 King Fahd Cup players
1994 FIFA World Cup players
1999 FIFA Confederations Cup players
Saudi Arabia international footballers
Saudi Arabian footballers
Al-Diriyah Club players
Al-Shabab FC (Riyadh) players
Al Nassr FC players
Al Sadd SC players
People from Dir'iya
Saudi Arabian expatriate footballers
Saudi Professional League players
Expatriate footballers in Qatar
Saudi Arabian expatriate sportspeople in Qatar
Association football defenders